John Blakeney (c. 1729 – 25 July 1789) was an Irish soldier.

He was son of John Blakeney and Grace Perrse, grandson of Robert Blakeney, brother of Robert Blakeney, Theophilus Blakeney and William Blakeney, and uncle of John Blakeney and Edward Blakeney.

As a soldier John Blakeney fought in the Battle of Culloden, the Battle of Matinico and the siege of Havana and reached the rank of Colonel.

He represented Athenry in the Irish House of Commons from 1763 to his death. 
He was High Sheriff of County Galway for 1768.

He died unmarried.

External Links
 https://web.archive.org/web/20090601105535/http://www.leighrayment.com/commons/irelandcommons.htm
 http://thepeerage.com/p27666.htm#i276657

1720s births
1789 deaths
British Army personnel of the American Revolutionary War
Irish MPs 1761–1768
Irish MPs 1769–1776
Irish MPs 1776–1783
Irish MPs 1783–1790
High Sheriffs of County Galway
Politicians from County Galway
27th Regiment of Foot officers
British Army personnel of the Jacobite rising of 1745
Members of the Parliament of Ireland (pre-1801) for County Galway constituencies